Michael Joseph Kennedy (1 March 1897 – 14 February 1965) was an Irish Fianna Fáil politician. He was a member of Dáil Éireann representing various constituencies from 1927 to 1965. He was first elected at the June 1927 general election for the Longford–Westmeath constituency. He moved to the new constituency of Meath–Westmeath in 1937, and in 1948 moved back to the newly re-created Longford–Westmeath constituency.

He served as Parliamentary Secretary to the Minister for Social Welfare from 1951 to 1954 and from 1957 to 1961.

References

 

1897 births
1965 deaths
Fianna Fáil TDs
Members of the 5th Dáil
Members of the 6th Dáil
Members of the 7th Dáil
Members of the 8th Dáil
Members of the 9th Dáil
Members of the 10th Dáil
Members of the 11th Dáil
Members of the 12th Dáil
Members of the 13th Dáil
Members of the 14th Dáil
Members of the 15th Dáil
Members of the 16th Dáil
Members of the 17th Dáil
Parliamentary Secretaries of the 16th Dáil
Parliamentary Secretaries of the 14th Dáil